The Bashkaus is a river in the Altai Republic in Siberia, Russia. It is a left tributary of the Chulyshman, which flows into Lake Teletskoye (Ob basin). It rises from a cirque lake in the eastern part of the Kuraiskii Mountain Range. In its lower reaches, it flows in a narrow valley, which often turns into a rocky canyon.

It is widely considered one of the most challenging rivers for white-water rafting in the former USSR. In Russia, it is known as a Class 5 river meaning that its technical difficulty, i.e. the difficulty in navigating it in a raft or canoe, is high while its remoteness or distance from assistance in the event of things going wrong is Class 6 (on the Russian scale of one to six.) Hence, the Bashkaus is anecdotally ranked as the second most difficult river in the former USSR to raft or canoe, behind the nearby Chulyshman River. The Bashkaus was first recorded as fully kayaked in 1992, by a group from Ireland.

References

External links 

 Kayaking in Russia

  Kayaking on the Baskaus River

Rivers of the Altai Republic